The Presbyterian Church in Paraguay is an independent confessional Reformed Calvinist denomination in Paraguay, it was founded by Brazilian missionaries.

History 
The Presbyterian Church in Paraguay (In ) was started as a mission work of the Presbyterian Church of Brazil (IPB) in the country of Paraguay. The first missionary was Evandro Luis da Silva, who arrived in Paraguay in the end of the 1960s. He performed the first Presbyterian worship in Concepcion that was then the second largest city in Paraguay. New members were converted and the work begun to develop steadily. The founding date of the church is 1969. The responsibility for the church was with Brazilians till the mid-1980s. In 1984 two national pastors (Silas Augusto Tscherne and Sebastiao Silvestre) were trained in Campinas and they were able to take over this work. The denomination is fully independent from the Brazilian Presbyterians, sister church relations was established between the PCP and the IPB. Official worship language are Spanish and Guarani.                     
The Presbyterian Church in Paraguay had 200 members in 5 congregation and 5 house fellowships in 2004.

Statistics 
The church has currently 6 congregations and several house fellowships, and 6 ordained pastors, namely Rev. Marcos Vieira, Rev. Francisco Villalba, Rev. Buena Ventura Giménez, Rev. Flavio Sousa, Rev. Eologio Giménez  and Rev. Marcos Machado. It has no women ministers, ordained clergy are men only.

The church maintains the Presbyterian Institute of Paraguay - Brazil. It has several mission efforts in Paraguay, the latest outreach is in the Presbyterian Church in Pedro Juan Caballero, Paraguay. It has congregations in Santa Rita, Concepcion, San Lorenzo, Belén and Asuncion.
In late 2013 a new church plant was launched in Asconcion.

Theology 
The church is part of the Reformed Church family, based on the teaching of John Calvin and the Scottish Reformator John Knox. Presbyterianism had great influence of the development of democracy. The IPP has representative church government.

The Iglesia Presbiteriana en el Paraguay adopted the :

Creeds 

Apostles Creed

Confessions 

Westminster Confession of Faith
Westminster Larger Catechism
Westminster Shorter Catechism

The Presbyterian Church in San Lorenzo celebrates the 25th anniversary of Presbyterianism in San Lorenzo, Paraguay.

External links 

 
 Official Facebook website
 Reformed Presbyterian Church in Marangatu
 Presbyterian Mission Church in Asúncion

References 

Presbyterian denominations in South America
Churches in Paraguay